College Square Swimming Pool is a swimming pool arena of Kolkata maintained by Kolkata Municipal Corporation. It is situated at College Street area adjacent to Hindu School and Surya Sen Street.

History 
The first swimming club to be constructed in this pool arena was College Square Swimming Club in the year 1927 by a group of sports enthusiasts of Kolkata, led by Pramoth Nath Ghosh.

Formation 

Though the swimming pool is administered by Municipality Corporation, it is allowed to be used by six swimming clubs namely College Square Swimming Club, Bowbazaar Bayam Samity, Self Culture Institute, YMCA Swimming Club, Sailendra Memorial Club, The Calcutta University Institute (Swimming Section).

Swimming Culture 
It is one of the oldest swimming pools of Kolkata other than the aquatic pool of Calcutta Swimming Club while having one of the oldest swimming clubs of Kolkata - College Square Swimming Club situated within its arena. This swimming pool is found to have considerable contribution towards history of aquatic culture of Kolkata.

Accidents and Controversies 

In August 2017, a veteran swimming trainer Kajal Dutta drowned in the concerned swimming pool. In spite of being swimming pool in nature, there was reported to be many unplanned structures underwater which was claimed to be formed in unauthorized manner. Such unsafe structures were blamed to be the reason for the death of the veteran swimming coach.

In August 2019, a novice swimmer trainee of Calcutta University Institute Swimming Section drowned at the swimming pool. Kolkata Municipal Corporation closed the entire swimming pool for seven odd days post such tragic incidence.

Religious Festivity and Popular Culture 

Each year, an event of Durga Puja is undertaken within the arena of the swimming pool and its adjoining area. This puja event is periodically reported to witness heavy footfall during the concerned festival time. During this festivity time, all aquatic activities are kept suspended.

References 

Swimming venues in India
Swimming clubs
Sports clubs in Kolkata
1927 establishments in British India